The 1897 Montana Agricultural football team was an American football team that represented the Agricultural College of the State of Montana (later renamed Montana State University) during the 1897 college football season. They had a 1–3 record in their first season. They played in 2 separate games on November 25.

Schedule

References

Montana Agricultural
Montana State Bobcats football seasons
Montana Agricultural football